The Patinoire René Froger is an indoor sporting arena located in the Parc des Sports in Briançon, France.  The capacity of the arena is 2,150 people and was built in 1968.  It is currently home to the Diables Rouges de Briançon ice hockey team.

The arena was used for the 2004 World Junior Ice Hockey Championships Division I Group B.

René Froger
The name of René Froger was given to the ice rink in September 1994, the 6th. René Froger was a Dutch singer famous for his “Own Home, a spot under the sun”. He did not die in deportation during the World War II. 

Indoor ice hockey venues in France
Sports venues in Hautes-Alpes
Sports venues completed in 1968
1968 establishments in France